The New Mexico Bootheel is a salient which comprises the southwestern corner of New Mexico.

It is characterized by basin and range topography with three north south trending mountain ranges, the Peloncillo Mountains, the Animas Mountains, and the Big Hatchet Mountains, separated by four valleys, the San Simon, Animas, Playas, and Hachita valleys.  A single road traverses just north of the bootheel, New Mexico State Road 9, while New Mexico State Road 80 (former US-80) skirts the western edge running south through the San Simon Valley.  The other two roads in the bootheel are State Road 338 running down Animas Valley and State Road 81 running from Hachita to Antelope Wells, a border crossing.

The bootheel is a sparsely populated (population density < 1 person/square mile) region known primarily as a cattle-ranching area, with the best-known ranch being the  Diamond A Ranch in the Animas Valley, although mining also played a part in the development of the bootheel with the abandoned mining town of old Hachita.  Land ownership is divided between publicly owned state and federal lands covering much of the mountain ranges and private lands in the valleys.  The only settlement is Antelope Wells, while the towns of Rodeo, Animas, and Hachita lie just to the northwest, north, and northeast respectively.  The former Phelps Dodge mining town of Playas is now a training facility for the United States Department of Homeland Security.

References

 
Chihuahuan Desert
Border irregularities of the United States
Geography of New Mexico
Geography of Hidalgo County, New Mexico